Last of the Summer Wine's fourth series originally aired on BBC1 between 9 November 1977 and 4 January 1978. All episodes from this series were written by Roy Clarke and produced and directed by Sydney Lotterby.

The fourth series was released on DVD in region 2 as a combined box set with series 3 on 26 July 2004. A box set featuring just series 4 was released for region 1 on 9 September 2008.

Outline
The trio in this series consisted of:

List of episodes
Regular series

Christmas Special (1978)

DVD release
The box set for series 3 and 4 was released by Universal Playback in July 2004.

In addition, Last of the Summer Wine: Vintage 1977 has been released on 9 September 2008 in Region 1 and included all episodes from the fourth series including a rare 1977 interview with Roy Clarke.

Notes

References

External links
Series 4 at the Internet Movie Database

Last of the Summer Wine series
1977 British television seasons
1978 British television seasons